Calamopus is a genus of spiders in the family Cheiracanthiidae. It was first described in 2001 by Deeleman-Reinhold. , it contains 2 species, from Thailand and Indonesia.

References

Araneomorphae genera
Spiders of Asia
Cheiracanthiidae